Magnús Pálsson (19 November 1912 – 6 August 1990) was an Icelandic water polo player. He competed in the men's tournament at the 1936 Summer Olympics.

References

1912 births
1990 deaths
Icelandic male water polo players
Olympic water polo players of Iceland
Water polo players at the 1936 Summer Olympics
Sportspeople from Reykjavík